The Seven Natural Wonders of the UK is a list compiled in May 2021 by the Royal Geographical Society.  The seven wonders were chosen for their "shared beauty, uniqueness, and geological significance".  There are four wonders in England (Wastwater, Dovedale, The Needles and the Jurassic Coast), one in Northern Ireland (Giant's Causeway), one in Scotland (Loch Coruisk & The Cuillins) and one in Wales (Pistyll Rhaeadr).

Description 
The list was compiled in May 2021 by the Royal Geographical Society in partnership with American outdoor clothing firm Merrell.  It consists of what the compilers consider the most beautiful nature spots in the United Kingdom.  The Royal Geographic Society's criteria for selecting the list were "shared beauty, uniqueness, and geological significance".  The seven wonders selected include four from England (Wastwater, Dovedale, The Needles and the Jurassic Coast), one from Northern Ireland (Giant's Causeway), one from Scotland (Loch Coruisk & The Cuillins) and one from Wales (Pistyll Rhaeadr).  Pistyll Rhaeadr has, since the 18th century, been considered one of the Seven Wonders of Wales.

A survey carried out by Merrell found that 41% of British adults had not visited a single one of the seven natural wonders.  The Jurassic Coast was the most visited, with 31% of those surveyed reporting having travelled there, while Pistyll Rhaeadr was the least visited, with only 6% of those surveyed stating that had made a trip there.  The survey found that only 10% of Britons had heard of all seven of the natural wonders.

The list was compiled following the COVID-19 pandemic which greatly restricted the ability of British people to travel and the compilers of the list hoped that it would inspire more travel to the locations selected.

List

See also 
Seven Wonders of the World
 Seven Natural Wonders
 New 7 Wonders of Nature

References 

Cultural lists by country
Landmarks in the United Kingdom
Geology of the United Kingdom